In ancient Celtic religion, Sulevia was a goddess worshipped in Gaul, Britain, and Galicia,  very often in the plural forms Suleviae or (dative) Sule(v)is. Dedications to Sulevia(e) are attested in about forty inscriptions, distributed quite widely in the Celtic world, but with particular concentrations in Noricum, among the Helvetii, along the Rhine, and also in Rome. Jufer and Luginbühl distinguish the Suleviae from another group of plural Celtic goddesses, the Matres, and interpret the name Suleviae as meaning "those who govern well". In the same vein, Patrizia de Bernardo Stempel connects Suleviae with Welsh hylyw 'leading (well)' and Breton helevez 'good behaviour'.

Epigraphy

The Suleviae have been identified in one inscription with the Junones, but mostly with the Matres, for example on an inscription from Roman Colchester, as well as on most of the inscriptions from Rome. The Colchester inscription reads:

MATRIBVS SVLEVIS SIMILIS ATTI F CI CANT VSLM
(Translated: To the Sulevi mothers, Similis the son of Attius, of the Civitas Cantiacorum, willingly and deservedly fulfills his vow.)

In another inscription, the dative singular Suleviae Idennicae is attested in conjunction with Roman goddess Minerva.

Relation to other deities 
Van Andringa interprets the Suleviae as "native domestic divinities honoured at all social levels". For the theory that the Suleviae were a triune version of Sulis Minerva, see Sulis. This theory is disputed by some researchers who find no direct links with Sulis, and suggest instead that the similarity in names is coincidental. Another theory connects the Suleviae with the Xulsigiae, known from a site at Trier; but this suggestion has also been contested.

See also
 Triple Goddess

References

Celtic goddesses
Gaulish goddesses
Gallaecian goddesses
Goddesses of the ancient Britons